Uyghur riots may refer to:
 2008 Uyghur unrest
 July 2009 Ürümqi riots